Ranworth is a village in Norfolk, England in The Broads, adjacent to Malthouse Broad and Ranworth Broad. It is located in the civil parish of Woodbastwick.

The village's name origin is uncertain 'Edge enclosure' or perhaps, 'Randi's enclosure.'

Church of St Helen
The 16th-century Church of St Helen, known as 'the Cathedral of the Broads', has a fine 15th century painted rood screen and a rare Antiphoner.  It is a Grade I listed building From the top of Ranworth church's  tower one can see many of the broads and rivers, as well as the Happisburgh lighthouse.

Notes 

http://kepn.nottingham.ac.uk/map/place/Norfolk/Ranworth%20with%20Panxworth

External links

 Ranworth Church and the Broadside Benefice Parishes
 Hi-res images of Ranworth Rood Screen

Villages in Norfolk
Broadland